Gyézil County, also Jiulong County; is a county located in southeastern Garzê Tibetan Autonomous Prefecture, Sichuan province, People's Republic of China. With a population of 52 thousand, mainly Tibetans, Hans, and Yis, it contains one town and 17 townships.

Geography and climate

Due to its elevation, Jiulong County has a subtropical highland climate (Köppen Cwb), with strong monsoonal influences; winters are frosty and summers warm with frequent rain. Over 75% of the annual precipitation of  occurs from June through September. With monthly percent possible sunshine ranging from 32% in July to 58% in January, the county seat receives 1,983 hours of bright sunshine annually. Diurnal temperature variation is large, averaging  annually.

References

External links

County-level divisions of Sichuan
Populated places in the Garzê Tibetan Autonomous Prefecture